Laurence Richard Canter (born 3 November 1989) is an English professional golfer who currently plays on the European Tour and formerly played in the LIV Golf Invitational Series.

Amateur career
Canter had a successful year in 2010, winning the South African Amateur Championship and playing in the St Andrews Trophy and Eisenhower Trophy. He was also part of the England team that won the European Amateur Team Championship that year and he also qualified for the 2010 Open Championship. He won the 2011 Spanish Amateur Open Championship.

Professional career
Canter turned professional in 2011, after winning the Spanish Amateur Open Championship. He played on the Challenge Tour from 2011 to 2013 before dropping down to the Pro Golf Tour in 2014 and 2015.

Canter has an unusual records of qualifying for the European Tour through Q-school, four separate times. He qualified in 2015, 2016 and 2017 but failed to regain his place on the tour on each occasion. After a season returning to the Challenge Tour, he finished tied for 5th in the 2019 European Tour Qualifying School to gain a place on the European Tour for 2020. 2020 proved to be more successful than his previous attempts on the tour. He had his first top-10 finish in the Hero Open and followed this with a tie for 5th place in the ISPS Handa Wales Open and runner-up finishes in the Portugal Masters and the Italian Open.

He finished tied-second at the 2021 BMW PGA Championship; one shot behind Billy Horschel.

Amateur wins
2010 South African Amateur Championship
2011 Spanish International Amateur Championship

Professional wins (1)

Jamega Pro Golf Tour wins (1)

Playoff record
Challenge Tour playoff record (0–1)

Results in major championships
Results not in chronological order in 2020.

CUT = missed the halfway cut
"T" = Tied
NT = No tournament due to COVID-19 pandemic

Results in World Golf Championships

1Cancelled due to COVID-19 pandemic

"T" = Tied
NT = No tournament

Team appearances
Amateur
St Andrews Trophy (representing Great Britain & Ireland): 2010
European Amateur Team Championship (representing England): 2010 (winners)
Eisenhower Trophy (representing England): 2010

See also
2015 European Tour Qualifying School graduates
2016 European Tour Qualifying School graduates
2017 European Tour Qualifying School graduates
2019 European Tour Qualifying School graduates

References

External links

English male golfers
European Tour golfers
LIV Golf players
Sportspeople from Bath, Somerset
1989 births
Living people